Atlas Cove is a cove on the north coast of Heard Island and McDonald Islands in the southern Indian Ocean, and is entered between the base of the Laurens Peninsula and Rogers Head.

It was named by American sealers after the schooner seal hunting fleet which landed at Heard Island in 1855.

From 1947 to 1955, Atlas Cove was the site of camps of visiting scientists.

In 1969, it was again occupied by American scientists. The settlement was expanded in 1971 by French scientists.

Mapping was updated in 2000.

References

External links
 Map of Atlas Cove and the northwestern coast of Heard Island
 Map of Heard Island and McDonald Islands, including all major topographical features

Coves of Antarctica
Bays of Heard Island and McDonald Islands